Charles Berton Lockhart (February 14, 1855 – September 4, 1948) was a merchant and political figure in New Brunswick, Canada. He represented the City of St. John in the Legislative Assembly of New Brunswick from 1896 to 1899 and from 1912 to 1916 as a Conservative member.

Personal life 
He was born in Moncton, New Brunswick, the son of Charles Dixon Lockhart, of Scottish descent, and Hannah Read, and was educated there. In 1884, he married Theodosia Hartt.

Career 
He served on Saint John City Council and also on the school board for 16 years. He was involved in the grocery business for several years before becoming a manager for an insurance company. Lockhart was a collector of customs in Saint John from 1916 to 1928. He was a commissioner of the Saint John General Hospital as well as the chairman of the Saint John Returned Soldiers Committee after World War I.

Death 
Charles Lockhart died at the age of 93 in the Saint John General Hospital on September 4 in the morning.

References 

The Canadian parliamentary companion, 1897, JA Gemmill
Obituary transcribed from a St. John's newspaper

1855 births
1948 deaths
People from Moncton
Progressive Conservative Party of New Brunswick MLAs
Saint John, New Brunswick city councillors